Southwark (Br  [ˈsʌðɨk]) Central was a borough constituency returning a single Member of Parliament to the House of Commons of the Parliament of the United Kingdom through the first past the post voting system. The constituency was a very compact and urban area, and was one of three divisions of the Parliamentary Borough of Southwark, which was identical to the Metropolitan Borough of Southwark, in South London. The creation of the constituency was recommended by the Boundary Commission in a report issued in 1917, and formally created by the Representation of the People Act 1918. It came into existence at the 1918 general election.

As the borough of Southwark had only 67,279 electors on 15 October 1946, the relevant date for the subsequent Boundary Commission review, the borough was only entitled to a single Member of Parliament. As a consequence Southwark Central was abolished as a separate constituency by the Representation of the People Act 1948, along with its neighbours Southwark North and Southwark South East and went out of existence at the 1950 general election, forming part of the re-established Southwark constituency.

Boundaries

When the constituency was created, it was defined to include three whole wards of the Metropolitan Borough of Southwark (St Mary's, St Paul's and Trinity) together with a small section of the St George's ward. This formed an area in two main parts linked by a narrow strip of land around Elephant and Castle. The southern section, between Kennington Park Road and Walworth Road, including the St Mary and St Paul wards, was almost entirely residential. It stretched to Kennington Park and to Avenue Road, being the southern boundary of the borough. Around the Elephant and Castle area the constituency included Newington Butts and the Metropolitan Tabernacle, but at its narrowest point it was only about 100 yards between the western boundary on Newington Causeway and the eastern boundary on the railway line through Elephant & Castle railway station.

North of Elephant and Castle, the constituency turned to the east and included a second area of Newington between New Kent Road and Newington Causeway in the Trinity ward. The southern boundary of this part of the constituency continued along New Kent Road to divide St George's ward along it and Tower Bridge Road up to the borough boundary with Bermondsey. The northern part of Trinity ward, north of Wickham Place, was not included. The constituency's last MP, future Chancellor Roy Jenkins, described it as "postage stamp-sized".

Members of Parliament

Elections

Elections in the 1910s

Elections in the 1920s

Elections in the 1930s

Elections in the 1940s

References

Sources 

Parliamentary constituencies in London (historic)
Constituencies of the Parliament of the United Kingdom established in 1918
Constituencies of the Parliament of the United Kingdom disestablished in 1950
Politics of the London Borough of Southwark